Kjærlighet paa pinde: sommerspøk i 4 akter (Love on a Stick: A Summer Comedy in Four Acts) is a Norwegian silent film from 1922. The comedian August Schønemann played Alexander Snobmann in his only film role. A bright future had been anticipated for him in silent film, but he died in 1925.

Other actors in the film include Ellen Sinding and Conrad Arnesen, and it was directed by Erling Eriksen. The film was Leif Sinding's first work in Norwegian cinematography as a producer. The film can be seen for free at the National Library of Norway website.

Plot
Alexander Snobman and Philip Helt compete for the favor of the dancer Eva Sommers. One day Snobman meets her in the woods and tries to win her over, but he then has to resort to force. Eva shouts for help, and the engineer Helt comes to rescue her. Snobman tries to win Eva several times, but is stopped in turn by a bull, Eva's grandmother, Nestor the guard dog, and an angry goat.

Censorship
In the film's fourth act, an undressing scene was edited out of the film.

Cast
 Ellen Sinding as Eva Sommer 
 August Schønemann as Alexander Snobmann 
 Conrad Arnesen as Philip Helt

References

External links

Kjærlighet paa pinde at the National Library of Norway

1922 films
Norwegian silent films
Norwegian black-and-white films
Norwegian comedy films
1922 comedy films